The 2019–20 Memphis Tigers men's basketball team represented the University of Memphis in the 2019–20 NCAA Division I men's basketball season. This was the 99th season of Tiger basketball, the second under head coach Penny Hardaway, and the seventh as members of the American Athletic Conference. They played their home games at the FedEx Forum.

Previous season
The Tigers finished the 2018–19 season 22–14, 11–7 in AAC play to finish in fifth place. They defeated Tulane and UCF in the AAC tournament before losing to Houston in the semifinals. In the 2019 NIT Tournament, they defeated San Diego in the first round before losing to Creighton in the second round.

Offseason

Departures

Incoming transfers

2019 recruiting class

2020 recruiting class

2021 recruiting class

Roster

Nov 8, 2019 - James Wiseman was ruled ineligible by the NCAA. After filing and subsequently dropping a lawsuit against the NCAA, Wiseman was ruled ineligible from November 20 to January 12.
Dec 11, 2019 - Ryan Boyce entered his name into the transfer portal. He would later transfer to Georgia State.
Dec 19, 2019 - Wiseman left the team to focus on preparing for the 2020 NBA draft.

Schedule and results

|-
!colspan=12 style=| Exhibition 
|-
 
 
 
 
 
 
|-
!colspan=12 style=| Regular season
|-

 

|-
!colspan=12 style=| AAC tournament
|-

|-

1.Cancelled due to the Coronavirus Pandemic

Rankings

*AP does not release post-NCAA Tournament rankings

Awards and honors

American Athletic Conference honors

All-AAC Awards
Player of the Year: Precious Achiuwa
Freshman of the Year: Precious Achiuwa

All-AAC First Team
Precious Achiuwa

All Freshman Team
Precious Achiuwa
Lester Quiñones

Player of the Week
Week 3: Precious Achiuwa

Rookie of the Week
Week 1: James Wiseman
Week 2: Lester Quiñones
Week 4: Boogie Ellis
Week 7: Precious Achiuwa
Week 9: Precious Achiuwa
Week 10: Precious Achiuwa
Week 11: D. J. Jefferies
Week 13: Precious Achiuwa
Week 15: Precious Achiuwa
Week 18: Precious Achiuwa

Source

References

Memphis
Memphis Tigers men's basketball seasons
Memphis Tigers men's basketball
Memphis Tigers men's basketball